AlternativeTo is a website which lists alternatives to web-based software, desktop computer software, and mobile apps, and sorts the alternatives by various criteria, including the number of registered users who have clicked the "Like" button for each of them on AlternativeTo.

Users can search the site to find better alternatives to an application they are using or previously have used, including free alternatives such as a free web application (cloud computing) which does not require any installation and can be accessed from any browser.

Differences to other software directory websites 
Unlike a number of other software directory websites, the software is not arranged into categories, but each individual piece of software has its own list of alternatives, permitting a more tailored listing approach. However, users can also search by tag to find software, which offers an alternative way of finding related software. Users can also narrow their search by focusing on particular platforms and license types (such as "free for non-commercial use").

AlternativeTo lists basic information such as platform and license type at the top of each entry, but does not have comparison tables listing software features side by side.

AlternativeTo allows anyone to register and suggest new alternatives, or to update the information held about existing entries. Suggestions and alterations are reviewed before being made publicly visible. Registration can be done via Facebook Connect or OpenID, both of which make it unnecessary to create a new password for the site.

As AlternativeTo is itself a web application, it even has a page for alternatives to itself.

Social web features 
Tweets from anyone mentioning particular pieces of software are also pulled in dynamically from Twitter. Each application has an RSS feed for notifying users of newly listed alternatives to that application. After a user has clicked the Like button next to an application, they are offered the opportunity to tell their friends on Facebook or their followers on Twitter that they liked it, and the tweet or post can be customised.

The site also has a forum. For software developers, a JSON API used to be available, but has been taken down indefinitely.

See also 

 Open Hub
 Open Directory Project
 ProgrammableWeb
Product Hunt
Free Software Directory

References

External links 
 

Computing websites
Review websites
Web applications
Internet properties established in 2009